Monnette Sudler (June 5, 1952 – August 21, 2022) was an American jazz guitarist from Philadelphia.

Early life and career
Sudler was born Monnette Goldman in Philadelphia, Pennsylvania. Her mother, Lea Goldman, married Truman W. Sudler in 1957. She grew up in the Nicetown-Tioga neighborhood of Philadelphia.

Her first exposure to jazz was listening to her great-uncle play piano. When she was fifteen, she took lessons on guitar at the Wharton Center in Philadelphia. She could play drums and piano, and she also composed, arranged, sang, and wrote poetry. Early in her career she worked with vibraphonist Khan Jamal in the Sounds of Liberation. In the 1970s she studied at Berklee School of Music in Boston and in the 1980s at Temple University. Time for a Change (1977) was her first album as band leader.

During her career, she worked with Kenny Barron, Hamiet Bluiett, Arthur Blythe, Dameronia, Sonny Fortune, Dave Holland, Freddie Hubbard, Joseph Jarman, Hugh Masekela, Cecil McBee, David Murray, Sunny Murray, Trudy Pitts, Odean Pope, Don Pullen, Sam Rivers, Shirley Scott, Archie Shepp, Leon Thomas, Steve Turre, Cedar Walton, Grover Washington Jr., and Reggie Workman.

Sudler died from blood cancer on August 21, 2022, at the age of 70.

Discography

As leader
 Time for a Change (Steeplechase, 1976)
 Brighter Days for You (Steeplechase, 1977)
 Live in Europe (Steeplechase, 1978)
 Other Side of the Gemini (Hardly, 1990)
 Just One Kiss (MSM, 1998)
 Meeting of the Spirits (Philly Jazz, 2005)
 Let the Rhythm Take You (MSM 2008)
 Where Have All the Legends Gone? (Heavenly Sweetness, 2009)

With Khan Jamal
 Drum Dance to the Motherland (Dogtown, 1973; Eremite, 2006)

References

External links
 
 

1952 births
2022 deaths
20th-century American guitarists
20th-century American women guitarists
21st-century American women
American jazz guitarists
Musicians from Philadelphia
Deaths from lung cancer in Pennsylvania